Ron Sparks (born May 20, 1977) is a Canadian comedian, actor, writer and producer. He was born in Chatham-Kent, Ontario and lives in Toronto, Ontario. He is best known as an alternative comedian and frequent guest on CBC Radio's The Debaters, and on TV as a regular and favourite juror on MuchMusic's highest-rated show, Video on Trial, also starring as The Judge in the Stars on Trial Christmas special and various other VOT spin-offs.

Comedy

Theatre

Sparks enjoyed performing in plays and sketches as a student, and at CKSS began writing scripts to perform in drama class and at assemblies. He did a sketch with fellow student Corey St. Peter about a refugee applying for Canadian citizenship at a televised swearing-in ceremony which he claims was met with total silence, saying "we were sure it was because they didn't understand English, but I've come to accept that we probably just stunk."

In high school and university he found success as a playwright. His farce Chuck Sent Me won the Grand Theatre Stage Presence Competition for young playwrights in 1997. His one act plays Richard Keats' Apartment of Doom and Home to Mother, a dramedy, both won the York University competition for playwrights in 2000 and 2001. Other works include A Thanksgiving That Would Even Make Great Aunt Gladys Proud (2nd place, 1999) and My Favourite Aunt (3rd place, 2001). Apartment of Doom and My Favourite Aunt would both be remounted as Toronto Fringe Festival shows.

At York University, Sparks wrote humorous articles and reviews for the student newspaper The Vandoo and was promoted to an editor, but quit after complaints and new guidelines from college administration made the job too constraining to be fun.

Improv and sketch

Sparks first began performing comedy regularly with York University's Vanier Improv Company as a student, where he became a standout and met his sketch troupe mates The Minnesota Wrecking Crew. They would go on to be nominated four straight years (2003–2006) for the Best Sketch Troupe Canadian Comedy Award, winning in 2003 and 2004. In 2006 they won again for Best Taped Live Performance for the CBC special Sketch with Kevin McDonald.

The MWC became the "house troupe" at Second City Toronto's Sketchy at Best showcase, where they would perform sets of mostly new sketches every week.

After his first year with the VIC and Vanier College Productions, Sparks was asked to perform in the following year's annual frosh week orientation show for new students. He got a lot of laughs and his first ever requests for autographs from the audience, "unfortunately I was playing a date rapist and it wasn't supposed to be funny, so the director got an earful and they never produced that play again".

Sparks was also a member of the sketch troupes Rocket 9, Gazebo Pals and the CCA-nominated Shoeless.

Stand-up

After performing on the show with the Wrecking Crew a few times, he began working the door for Toronto's legendary ALTdot COMedy Lounge at the Rivoli in 2002. At show producer Zoe Rabnett's urging, he tried performing stand-up in 2003 at The ALTdot COMedy Lounge and then won that year's Tim Sims Award, given to Toronto's most promising new comedy act, in just his 20th set. He then also won the 2004 Canadian Comedy Award for Best Stand-up Newcomer, becoming the first person to win both. Frank Magazine described him as "the next stand-up wunderkind". After his Tim Sims Award winning Cream of Comedy showcase, he was invited to write and star in his own series of shorts for The Comedy Network, From the Desk of Ron Sparks.

Stand-up credits include Just for Laughs as well as the Halifax, Winnipeg, Laughing Gas and YYC Comedy Festivals. He was JFL's Toronto Homegrown Champion in 2007 and has performed in various JFL and JFL-42 shows including Set List, The Alternative Show with Andy Kindler and The Debaters. He has opened for such comedians as Kyle Kinane, Moshe Kasher, Russell Peters, Kevin Pollak, Marc Maron, Janeane Garofalo, Norm Macdonald, Joan Rivers, Brian Posehn, Mike Wilmot, David Cross, Andy Kindler, Tom Green, Doug Stanhope and Todd Barry.

His 2008 CTV Comedy Now! stand-up special won a WorldFest Award and two Canadian Comedy Awards.

When the ALTdot added a second weekly show, the SketchDot COMedy Lounge, Sparks was invited to do a weekly Weekend Update style segment, The News Desk with Ron Sparks.

He is not related to fellow stand-up comedian Hal Sparks.

Film & TV

On television he starred in MuchMusic's highest rated show Video on Trial and its spin-off, Stars on Trial, also writing for those and other MuchMusic series. He co-wrote and starred as Chris Christie in the series You Got Trumped, for which he won multiple awards. He was also a regular panelist on the Super Channel series Too Much Information and has been a regular on various Ed the Sock series (including co-hosting the cult hit This Movie Sucks!), and T1's The Toronto Show as Ron the Hollywood Reporter and other characters.

Other TV credits include NBC's The Firm, The Beaverton, This Hour Has 22 Minutes, Meet the Family, Straight Man, Clumsy & Shy, Dark Rising: The Savage Tales of Summer Vale, The Jon Dore Television Show, Sox in a Box and The Invasion Report. He was invited to audition for Saturday Night Live. He also auditioned for The Daily Show but didn't get the job and claims to be their shortest audition ever.

He has also appeared in such films as Medium Raw, Dark Rising, By George, Sweetener and Ham & Cheese.

He is the subject of The Essential Actor's Guide: Spotlight on Ron Sparks, part of a series of 32 books about actors. Other subjects include Javier Bardem, Daniel Day-Lewis, Colin Firth, Philip Seymour Hoffman, Angelina Jolie, Tommy Lee Jones, Heath Ledger, Brad Pitt, Julia Roberts and Kate Winslet.

Uwe Boll

In 2006 Sparks offered to fight Uwe Boll, who had challenged his critics to a series of boxing matches leading up to the release of his movie Postal.

Radio

Sparks is a regular and favourite guest on CBC Radio's The Debaters (which he also writes for). He has also appeared on Brave New Waves, Definitely Not the Opera and Out Front. He had his own weekly segment The News Desk with Ron Sparks on 102.1 The Edge, based on his live News Desk with Ron Sparks shows.

Filmography

Awards and nominations

Canadian Comedy Awards
At the 2007 Awards' "State of the Industry" event, Ron was unofficially voted "North America's Sexiest Comedian" by acclaim after host Harry Doupe ran his name against Nicole Arbour. This was in response to Arbour having billed herself with that title despite never actually having won it anywhere. Neither comedian was in attendance.

References

External links

1977 births
Living people
Canadian Baptists
Canadian male stage actors
Canadian male television actors
21st-century Canadian screenwriters
Canadian stand-up comedians
Canadian television directors
Canadian television personalities
Canadian television producers
Canadian male film actors
Film producers from Ontario
Comedians from Toronto
Ed the Sock
Film directors from Toronto
Male actors from Toronto
Canadian male television writers
People from Chatham-Kent
21st-century Canadian dramatists and playwrights
Canadian sketch comedians
Canadian male dramatists and playwrights
York University alumni
Writers from Toronto
This Hour Has 22 Minutes
21st-century Canadian comedians
Canadian male comedians
Canadian Comedy Award winners
Canadian male screenwriters